The 1979 NCAA Division I-AA Football Championship Game was a postseason college football game between the Eastern Kentucky Colonels and the Lehigh Engineers (now the Lehigh Mountain Hawks). The game was played on December 15, 1979, at Orlando Stadium (now Camping World Stadium) in Orlando, Florida. The culminating game of the 1979 NCAA Division I-AA football season, it was won by Eastern Kentucky, 30–7.

Teams
The participants of the Championship Game were the finalists of the 1979 I-AA Playoffs, which began with a four-team bracket.

Eastern Kentucky Colonels

Eastern Kentucky finished their regular season with a 9–2 record (5–1 in conference); their losses were to East Tennessee State of Division I-A and conference rival Murray State. Tied for third with Lehigh in the final AP Poll for I-AA, the Colonels were the at-large selection to the four-team playoff; they defeated Nevada, the West selection, by a score of 33–30 in double overtime to reach the final. This was the first appearance for Eastern Kentucky in a Division I-AA championship game.

Lehigh Engineers

Lehigh also finished their regular season with a 9–2 record; they had lost to Colgate of Division I-A and Delaware of Division II. Tied with Eastern Kentucky for third in the final AP Poll for I-AA, the Engineers were the East selection to the playoff; they defeated Murray State, the South selection, by a 28–9 score to reach the final. This was also the first appearance for Lehigh in a Division I-AA championship game.

Game summary

Scoring summary

Game statistics

See also
 1979 NCAA Division I-AA football rankings

References

Further reading

External links
 EKU vs Lehigh - 1979 1st Quarter via YouTube

Championship Game
NCAA Division I Football Championship Games
Eastern Kentucky Colonels football games
Lehigh Mountain Hawks football games
American football in Orlando, Florida
Sports competitions in Orlando, Florida
NCAA Division I-AA Football Championship Game
20th century in Orlando, Florida
NCAA Division I-AA Football Championship Game